Marc Brown (born July 5, 1969) is an American basketball coach and retired professional player. He is currently head basketball coach at New Jersey City University. He played professionally for 15 years following an All-American college career at Siena College.

College career

Brown, a  point guard, played basketball at Columbia High School in Maplewood, New Jersey, graduating in 1987, and played collegiately at Siena. As a sophomore, Brown led Siena to its first NCAA tournament appearance in 1989 then led the 14th-seeded Saints to a first round upset over 3 seed Stanford. Brown scored 32 points, handed out 6 assists, and hit the winning free throws in the 80–78 victory.  He was named an honorable mention All-American by the Associated Press that year.

Brown ended up as a four-time first team All-Conference performer in the ECAC North and the Metro Atlantic Athletic Conference (MAAC), and was named the conference's player of the year as a senior in 1991. He also repeated as an AP honorable mention All-American that season. Brown ended his Siena career as the school's leading scorer (2,284 career points),assists (796), and fourth in steals (221). He was elected to the school's athletic Hall of Fame in 1998.

Professional career

Brown went undrafted in the 1991 NBA draft, and embarked on a 15-year professional career taking him to Portugal, France, Brazil, Venezuela and Mexico. He also played in the Continental Basketball Association for the Albany Patroons and Fort Wayne Fury.

Coaching career
After retiring from basketball in 2007, Marc Brown followed his father Charles Brown as head coach at New Jersey City University on an interim basis. In 2010, Brown was named head coach of the Knights. In the 2010–11 season Brown lead New Jersey City University to their 18th NCAA Division III tournament, guiding the team to a victory over Montclair State University in the conference championship game. The victory guided NJCU to their 12th New Jersey Athletic Conference title.

Coaching record

NCAA DIII

References

External links
NJCU Coaching bio
French League profile

1969 births
Living people
Albany Patroons players
American expatriate basketball people in Brazil
American expatriate basketball people in France
American expatriate basketball people in Mexico
American expatriate basketball people in Portugal
American expatriate basketball people in Venezuela
American men's basketball players
Basketball players from New Jersey
BCM Gravelines players
College men's basketball head coaches in the United States
Columbia High School (New Jersey) alumni
Flamengo basketball players
Fort Wayne Fury players
Halcones de Xalapa players
HTV Basket players
Minas Tênis Clube basketball players
People from Maplewood, New Jersey
Point guards
Siena Saints men's basketball players
Sportspeople from Essex County, New Jersey